Raymond Vincent Buivid (August 15, 1915 – July 5, 1972) was an American football player who played quarterback in the National Football League (NFL) for the Chicago Bears.

A versatile player, Buivid played quarterback, halfback, and defensive back for the Marquette Golden Avalanche football team. He threw 13 touchdowns his junior year (1935). In 1936, he finished third in the voting for the Heisman Trophy and was a consensus All-American as a halfback, though he completed over 50% of his passes as quarterback as well. Marquette finished 20th in the country, and played in their first ever bowl game, the first Cotton Bowl Classic. They lost 16–6 to TCU led by Sammy Baugh.

Buivid signed with the Chicago Bears on October 11, 1937 after missing the first three games of the season. In the season finale against the cross-town rival Chicago Cardinals, he became the first player to throw five touchdowns in a single game, and also caught one. Despite this performance, he appeared in just six games that season, all behind starting quarterback Bernie Masterson, attempting just 35 passes. The 9–1 Bears won the Western division, and played in the 1937 NFL Championship Game against the Washington Redskins, led by fellow rookie Sammy Baugh (who was drafted after Buivid, despite defeating him in the Cotton Bowl). Buivid was just 3 for 12 passing and 3 for -6 yards rushing with three turnovers, including a muffed punt late in the fourth  quarter to seal the defeat.

The next season, he appeared in 11 games but attempted just 48 passes for 295 yards, along with 32 rushes for 65 yards. He retired after just two seasons at age 23 to serve in World War II as a lieutenant in the navy.

Statistics

References

1915 births
1972 deaths
American football halfbacks
American football quarterbacks
Chicago Bears players
Marquette Golden Avalanche football players
All-American college football players
United States Navy personnel of World War II
Sportspeople from Sheboygan, Wisconsin
Players of American football from Wisconsin
United States Navy officers
Military personnel from Wisconsin